Catherine Charlotte Raper (1766–1809) was an English pastellist.

Raper was almost certainly the daughter of Henry and Catherine Raper who was baptized in the church of St Andrew Holborn. In 1789, she received the Greater Silver Pallet Award from the Society of Arts for one of her pastels. Later that year, in Calcutta, she married a colonel in the service of the East India Company, James Edward Brown. Five years later, still in that city, she married again, this time to Lieutenant Charles Fraser. The couple had ten children, three of whom were born after the couple returned to London. Raper died in Lewisham.

References

1766 births
1809 deaths
18th-century English painters
18th-century English women artists
Artists from London
English women painters
Pastel artists